This is a non-exhaustive list of Bulgaria women's international footballers – association football players who have appeared at least once for the senior Bulgaria women's national football team.

Players

See also 
 Bulgaria women's national football team

References 

 
International footballers
International footballers
Bulgaria
Football in Bulgaria
Association football player non-biographical articles